Georges Darien (pseudonym for Georges Hippolyte Adrien; 1862–1921) was a French writer associated with anarchism and an outspoken advocate of Georgism.

Works

Books

 Bas les coeurs ! (1889)
 Biribi (1890)
 Le Voleur (1897)
 La Belle France (1898)
 L’Épaulette (1901) (not published)

Pamphlets

 Les Pharisiens

Plays

 L'ami de l'ordre (1898)

References 
 Auriant (Alexandre Hadjivassiliou), Darien et l'inhumaine comédie, Brussels: Ambassade du livre, 1966
 W.D. Redfern, Georges Darien: Robbery and Private Enterprise, Amsterdam: Rodopi, 1985
 David Bosc, Georges Darien, Éditions Sulliver, 1996
 Valia Gréau, Georges Darien et l'anarchisme littéraire, Editions du Lérot, 2002

External links 
 
 
 Website about Darien, in French

1862 births
1921 deaths
Writers from Paris
19th-century French writers
French anarchists
Georgists
French male writers
19th-century French male writers